Greeshma Jwala is a 1981 Indian Malayalam film,  directed by P. G. Vishwambharan. The film stars Ratheesh, Sukumaran, Seema and Surekha in the lead roles. The film has musical score by A. T. Ummer.

Cast

Ratheesh as Karuthan
Sukumaran as Hari
Seema as Seetha
Surekha as Valli
Achankunju as Kattumooppan
Bahadoor as Unnithan
Kunjandi as Varkey
Kuthiravattam Pappu as Madman
Mala Aravindan as Nair
P. K. Abraham as Priest
Renuchandra
Santhakumari as Gaurikuttyamma
Thrissur Elsy as Seetha's mother
T. G. Ravi as Kariyachan 
 Beena Kumbalangi as Chothi

Soundtrack
The music was composed by A. T. Ummer and the lyrics were written by Poovachal Khader.

References

External links
 

1981 films
1980s Malayalam-language films
Films directed by P. G. Viswambharan